The Embassy of the United States of America in Dar es Salaam is the diplomatic mission of the United States in Tanzania.

History
On 7 August 1998, this embassy, at its former address of 36 Laibon Road, along with the U.S. Embassy in Nairobi, was the target of a bomb attack perpetrated by al-Qaeda. The bomb attack in Dar es Salaam killed 11 people.

The new embassy compound was opened on March 4, 2003, in Dar es Salaam. The embassy is a twenty-two acre compound that houses two main structures; the Chancery and the USAID Building.

See also
 United States Ambassador to Tanzania

References

External links
 

United States
Dar es Salaam
Tanzania–United States relations